This was the first edition of the tournament.

Gong Maoxin and Zhang Ze won the title after defeating Gao Xin and Li Zhe 6–3, 4–6, [13–11] in the final.

Seeds

Draw

References
 Main Draw

Chengdu Challenger - Doubles
2016 Doubles